The 2015 Kazakhstani women's football championship is the 11th season of the Kazakhstani women's football championship, the highest women's football league competition in Kazakhstan. The season began in April 2015 and finished in November. BIIK-Kazygurt were the defending championship title.

Teams

Format
Team play each other four times, thus totalling 16 matches per team.

League table

Top scorers

References

External links
Federation website
uefa.com - standings, fixtures

Kazakhstani
Kazakhstani
Women's football competitions in Kazakhstan